Eugene Van Taylor is a retired American soccer goalkeeper who spent two seasons in the North American Soccer League, three in the American Soccer League and five in the Major Indoor Soccer League.  He retired in 2015 after thirty years as the head coach of the men's soccer program at Lander University.

Van Taylor graduated from West Essex High School where he was a Parade Magazine High School All American soccer player. He attended Erskine College where he was a 1973 Honorable Mention (third team) All American soccer player.  He graduated in 1975 with a bachelor's degree in health and physical education.  In 1982, he was inducted into the Erskine College Athletic Hall of Fame.  He is ranked fourth on the NAIA single-game saves list.

In 1975, the New York Cosmos of the North American Soccer League selected Van Taylor in the first round of the NASL draft, but he never made the first team.  The Cosmos traded him to the Miami Toros in 1976 where he was Runner-Up for NASL 'Rookie of the Year'.  In 1977, he played for the Fort Lauderdale Strikers as Gordon Banks' backup before moving to the New York Eagles of the American Soccer League in 1978.  In 1979 and 1980, he played of the Columbus Magic.  In the fall of 1980, Van Taylor signed with the expansion Baltimore Blast of the Major Indoor Soccer League.  He played six games then was traded to the Phoenix Inferno.  He remained with the Inferno through the 1983–1984 season when the team was known as the Phoenix Pride.

In 1985, he was hired as the head coach of the Lander University men's soccer team where he amassed over 350 wins and retired in 2015 as one of the winningest coaches in NCAA Division II history.  He is also former manager of Premier Development League outfit, Palmetto FC Bantams.

References

External links
NASL/MISL stats

1953 births
Living people
American soccer coaches
American soccer players
American Soccer League (1933–1983) players
Columbus Magic players
Major Indoor Soccer League (1978–1992) players
Miami Toros players
North American Soccer League (1968–1984) indoor players
North American Soccer League (1968–1984) players
Fort Lauderdale Strikers (1977–1983) players
New York Eagles players
Phoenix Inferno players
Phoenix Pride players
Erskine College alumni
Soccer players from Ohio
People from Portsmouth, Ohio
Association football goalkeepers
Soccer players from New Jersey
Sportspeople from Essex County, New Jersey
West Essex High School alumni